Joseph Downey (4 February 1895 – 18 April 1934) was an Australian cricketer. He played in nine first-class matches for Queensland between 1912 and 1915.

See also
 List of Queensland first-class cricketers

References

External links
 

1895 births
1934 deaths
Australian cricketers
Queensland cricketers
Cricketers from Queensland